The first government of Francina Armengol was formed on 2 July 2015, following the latter's election as President of the Balearic Islands by the Parliament of the Balearic Islands on 30 June and her swearing-in on 2 July, as a result of the loss of the absolute majority by the People's Party (PP) at the 2019 regional election and the emergence of a left-of-centre majority led by the Socialist Party of the Balearic Islands (PSIB–PSOE).

The cabinet comprised members of the PSIB–PSOE, More for Mallorca (Més) and More for Menorca (MpM), as well as a number of independents proposed by all three parties.

Investiture

Council of Government
The Government of the Balearic Islands was structured into the offices for the president, the vice president, 10 ministries and the post of the spokesperson of the Government.

Departmental structure
Francina Armengol's first government was organised into several superior and governing units, whose number, powers and hierarchical structure varied depending on the ministerial department.

Unit/body rank
() General secretary
() Director-general
() Temporary staff

Notes

References

2015 establishments in the Balearic Islands
2019 disestablishments in the Balearic Islands
Cabinets established in 2015
Cabinets disestablished in 2019
Cabinets of the Balearic Islands